Elections to Sefton Metropolitan Borough Council were held on 10 June 2004. The whole council was up for election with boundary changes since the last election in 2003. Overall turnout was 43.9%.

Election result

Ward results

References

2004 English local elections
2004
2000s in Merseyside